Ariadna Trias Jordán (born 27 April 1995) is a Spanish professional racing cyclist, who most recently rode for UCI Women's Continental Team .

References

External links
 

1995 births
Living people
Spanish female cyclists
Sportspeople from Girona
Cyclists from Catalonia
21st-century Spanish women